The 1997–98 Ukrainian Amateur Cup  was the second annual season of Ukraine's football knockout competition for amateur football teams. The competition started on 28 September 1997 and concluded on 30 May 1998.

Last season winner FC Domobudivnyk participated in the 1997–98 Ukrainian Cup and was not able to play.

Teams

Three regions that were represented last season, chose not to participate in the competition among which are such oblasts Khmelnytskyi, Odesa, and Kiev. Instead there debuted representatives from four new oblast among which are Cherkasy, Rivne, Vinnytsia, Zaporizhia.

Only two team of the last season, participated (reentered) this season.

Competition schedule

First qualification round

Second qualification round

|}

Quarterfinals (1/4)

|}

Semifinals (1/2)

|}

Final

|}

See also
 1997–98 Ukrainian Football Amateur League
 1997–98 Ukrainian Cup

References

External links
 1997–98 Ukrainian Amateur Cup at the Footpass (Football Federation of Ukraine)

Ukrainian Amateur Cup
Ukrainian Amateur Cup
Amateur Cup